County class may refer to:

 County-class destroyer, a post–World War II class of guided missile destroyers
 County-class cruiser, pre–World War II class of heavy cruiser
 The County class of Great Western Railway locomotives, were both a class of  4-4-0 locomotives built between 1904 and 1912 and a class of  4-6-0 locomotives built between 1945 and 1947
 Monmouth-class cruiser of pre–World War I armoured cruisers, also known as County class
 Talbot County-class tank landing ship, a post–World War II class of landing ships
 County-class patrol vessel, a class of patrol vessel operated by the Jamaican Coast Guard